Long Canyon is a canyon in Navajo County, Arizona.

References

Canyons and gorges of Arizona
Landforms of Navajo County, Arizona
Geography of the Navajo Nation
Colorado Plateau
Old Spanish Trail (trade route)